Fox Sports Networks (FSN), formerly known as Fox Sports Net, was the collective name for a group of regional sports channels in the United States. Formed in 1996 by News Corporation, the networks were acquired by The Walt Disney Company on March 20, 2019, following its acquisition of 21st Century Fox. A condition of that acquisition imposed by the U.S. Department of Justice required Disney to sell the regional networks by June 18, 2019, 90 days after the completion of its acquisition. Disney subsequently agreed to sell the networks (excluding the YES Network, being reacquired by Yankee Global Enterprises) to Sinclair; the transaction was completed on August 22, 2019. The networks continued to use the Fox Sports name only under a transitional license agreement while rebranding options were explored.  A rebranding cross-partnership with Bally's Corporation took effect on March 31, 2021, and the networks were rebranded as Bally Sports, ending the Fox Sports Networks branding after 25 years.

Each of the channels in the group carried regional broadcasts of sporting events from various professional, collegiate and high school sports teams (with broadcasts typically exclusive to each individual channel, although some were shown on multiple FSN channels or syndicated to a local broadcast station within a particular team's designated market area), along with regional and national sports discussion, documentary and analysis programs.

Depending on their individual team rights, some Fox Sports Networks maintained overflow feeds available via subscription television providers in their home markets, which provided alternate programming when not used to carry game broadcasts that the main feed could not carry due to scheduling conflicts. Fox Sports Networks was headquartered in Houston, Texas, with master control facilities based in both Houston and Los Angeles; FSN also maintained production facilities at Stage 19 at Universal Studios Florida (which formerly served as home of Nickelodeon Studios until its closure in 2005).

History

Beginnings

At the dawn of the cable television era, many regional sports networks (RSNs) vied to compete with the largest national sports network, ESPN. The most notable were the SportsChannel network, which first began operating in 1976 with the launch of the original SportsChannel (now MSG Plus) in the New York City area and later branched out into channels serving Chicago and Florida; Prime Network, which launched in 1983 with Home Sports Entertainment (now Bally Sports Southwest) as its charter member network and later branched out onto the West Coast as "Prime Sports"; and SportSouth, an RSN operated by the Turner Broadcasting System.

On October 31, 1995, News Corporation, which ten years earlier launched the Fox Broadcasting Company, a general entertainment broadcast network that formed its own sports division in 1994 with the acquisition of the television rights to the National Football Conference of the National Football League, entered into a joint venture with TCI's Liberty Media, acquiring a 50% ownership interest in the company's Prime Sports affiliates Liberty in turn gained a stake in Fox's year-old cable channel FX. On July 3, 1996, News Corporation and Liberty Media/TCI announced that the Prime Sports networks would be rebranded under the new "Fox Sports Net" brand; the Prime Sports-branded affiliates were officially relaunched as Fox Sports Net on November 1 of that year. The first new network to come out of the partnership was Fox Sports Arizona which launched on September 7, 1996, nearly two months before the existing networks would be rebranded. That same year, Fox purchased SportSouth from Turner, and rebranded that network as Fox Sports South in January 1997.

On June 30, 1997, the Fox/Liberty joint venture purchased a 40% interest in Cablevision/NBC's sports properties including the SportsChannel America networks, Madison Square Garden, and the New York Knicks and New York Rangers professional sports franchises, a deal worth $850 million; the deal formed the venture National Sports Partners to run Fox Sports Net's national programming operations. In early 1998, SportsChannel America was integrated into the Fox Sports Net family of networks; SportsChannel Florida, however, remained as the lone SportsChannel America-branded network before it joined FSN as well in 2000 after News Corporation and Cablevision purchased Florida Panthers owner Wayne Huizenga's controlling interest in that network.

Fox ownership
In 1999, Liberty Media (which had become a subsidiary of AT&T when AT&T acquired TCI earlier that year) sold its interest in Fox Sports Net and FX to News Corp. The sale was part of a complex transaction involving a stock swap that gave Liberty an 8% interest in News Corp, making it the second largest shareholder. News Corp became the sole owner of Fox Sports Net.

On July 11, 2000, Comcast purchased a majority interest in the Minneapolis-based Midwest Sports Channel and Baltimore-based Home Team Sports from Viacom. News Corporation, a minority owner in both networks, wanted to acquire them outright and integrate the two networks into Fox Sports Net. Home Team Sports had been affiliated with FSN since 1996. The company filed a lawsuit against Comcast ten days later on July 21, in an attempt to block the sale. On September 7, 2000, as part of a settlement between the two companies, Comcast traded its equity interest in Midwest Sports Channel (which became Fox Sports Net North) to News Corporation in exchange for exclusive ownership of Home Team Sports (which subsequently joined competing regional sports network Comcast SportsNet as Comcast SportsNet Mid-Atlantic, now NBC Sports Washington).

In September 2004, Fox Sports Net became known simply as "FSN"; however the former name remained in common use until 2010, when "Fox Sports Local" was adopted for use in referencing its regional networks. On February 22, 2005, Fox's then-parent company, News Corporation, acquired full ownership of FSN/Fox Sports Local, following an asset trade with Cablevision Systems Corporation, in which Fox sold its interest in Madison Square Garden and the arena's NBA and NHL team tenants in exchange for acquiring sole ownership of Fox Sports Ohio and Fox Sports Florida. Cablevision simultaneously gained sole ownership of Fox Sports Chicago and Fox Sports New York, and a 50% interest in Fox Sports New England (with Comcast retaining its existing 50% stake); Fox and Cablevision, however, retained joint ownership of Fox Sports Bay Area.

Affiliate realignments
Fox Sports Chicago ceased operations in June 2006, after losing the regional cable television rights to local professional teams (including the Chicago Bulls, Blackhawks, Cubs and White Sox) two years earlier to the newly launched Comcast SportsNet Chicago.

On December 22, 2006, News Corporation sold its interest in four Fox Sports regional networks – FSN Utah, FSN Pittsburgh, FSN Northwest and FSN Rocky Mountain – as well as its 38.5% ownership stake in satellite provider DirecTV to Liberty Media for $550 million in cash and stock, in exchange for Liberty's 16.3% stake in News Corporation. On May 4, 2009, DirecTV Group Inc. announced it would become a part of Liberty's entertainment unit, with plans to spin off certain properties into a separate company under the DirecTV name, which would operate the four acquired FSN-affiliated networks through DirecTV Sports Networks, a new division formed on November 19, 2009, upon the spin-off's completion.

On April 30, 2007, Cablevision sold its 50% interests in the New England and Bay Area networks to Comcast for $570 million; both networks became part of Comcast SportsNet, with FSN New England relaunching as Comcast SportsNet New England in July 2007 and FSN Bay Area relaunching as Comcast SportsNet Bay Area March 2008. Despite Cablevision's sale of the networks, the channels continued to use "Fox Sports Net/National Sports Partners" in its copyright tag until 2008 (the copyright used has since changed to "National Sports Programming").

On April 1, 2011, DirecTV Sports Networks rebranded its FSN regional affiliates under the Root Sports brand.

In 2012, News Corporation acquired a 49% stake in the YES Network, the regional sports network in the New York metropolitan area co-owned by Yankee Global Enterprises. It was also in that year that FSN/Fox Sports Local relocated its headquarters from the Fox Studio Lot in Los Angeles to Houston, Texas, and then re-branded to its current branding. The FSN owned-and-operated networks were spun off along with most of News Corporation's U.S. entertainment properties into 21st Century Fox on July 1, 2013. On January 25, 2014, 21st Century Fox then became the YES Networks' majority owner by purchasing an additional 31% share of it, increasing the company's ownership interest from 49% to 80%. In September 2013, the network gained the affiliation for FSN's national programming (sharing it with MSG Plus, the former FSN New York)

Sale to Sinclair Broadcast Group 
On December 14, 2017, The Walt Disney Company announced their intent to acquire 21st Century Fox for $52.4 billion after the spin-off of certain businesses into a new entity (Fox Corporation). While the acquisition was originally slated to include Fox Sports' regional operations (which, presumably, would have been re-aligned with Disney's ESPN division), the Justice Department ordered that they be divested within 90 days of the completion of the acquisition due to the concentration of the market that ESPN would hold.

Sinclair Broadcast Group was mentioned as the most likely buyer for the other FSN networks, but would need the assistance of a private equity firm to help raise the cash needed for the purchase. The group's other sports properties include Stadium—a national sports network distributed via over-the-air digital television and internet streaming, Tennis Channel, as well as Marquee Sports Network, a joint venture with the Chicago Cubs. Over 40 parties were reported to have expressed interest, including Silver Lake Partners and William Morris Endeavor in a joint deal, Charter Communications, Discovery (who operates the Eurosport networks in Europe), Amazon.com Inc., Apollo Global Management, The Blackstone Group, CVC Capital Partners, Ice Cube and LL Cool J, Kohlberg Kravis Roberts, Nexstar Media Group, Providence Equity Partners, and YouTube. Due to a clause imposed on the original sale, Yankee Global Enterprises had a right of first refusal to purchase Fox's share in YES Network. Allen & Company and JPMorgan Chase, who were handling the FSN sale for Disney, asked that all bids include YES in their offers.

Fox did not bid for the channels in the first round. On November 20, 2018, Amazon, Sinclair and CVC jointly, Apollo, KKR and Tegna officially bid for the network.  It was also reported that a Sinclair/CVC joint venture was the leading bidder. In December 2018, it was reported that due to the low bids, there was the possibility that the networks could be sold individually instead of as a single group, and that the banks were in talks with those who made partial bids, such as Amazon (who only bid for the YES Network) and Charter (who only bid for Fox Sports South). Minnesota Twins owner Jim Pohlad was reportedly interested in his team's broadcaster Fox Sports North. Discovery CEO David Zaslav stated that the company had considered a bid, but that regional sports networks were a "very treacherous market".

In a January 2019 SEC filing, Fox Corporation stated that it no longer had any plans to bid for the channels. On January 11, 2019 CNBC reported that Apollo, Blackstone, CVC and other bidders except Sinclair backed out of the deal for the networks with the sole bidder being the Sinclair/CVC joint venture. It was also reported that the possibility of spinning out the channels as an independent company was also being considered. In February 2019, it was reported that Apollo and Sinclair had dropped out (but with the former seeking a new partner), but that Liberty Media and Major League Baseball had made offers. Later that month, it was reported that Pohlad and Detroit Pistons owner Tom Gores (via his private equity firm Platinum Equity) had joined the Liberty Media bid.

On March 8, 2019, it was reported that the Yankees had reached a deal to re-purchase Fox's share in the YES Network for $3.5 billion, with Sinclair, Amazon, and The Blackstone Group holding minority shares. MLB also confirmed a $10 billion bid, seeking to use them to bolster the income of its small-market teams. It was also reported that month that Ice Cube and LL Cool J (via Ice Cube's 3-on-3 basketball league Big3—which had Fox as its initial broadcast partner) were also preparing a bid of around $15 billion. Big3 stated that it wanted to expand the channels to include programming covering "broader cultural and political topics" of local interest alongside sports. In April 2019, Big3 filed a complaint with the Department of Justice and FCC, accusing Charter Communications of attempting to "undermine" its bid by threatening to not carry the channels if it won the auction. Liberty Media owner John Malone has an ownership stake in Charter; the company denied Big3's allegations. The final round of bids were due on April 15, 2019, with bids having been in excess of $10 billion or higher. Liberty and MLB were reported to have partnered on a joint bid, Big3's bid contained $6.5 billion in debt and only $3 billion in outside funding, while Sinclair had re-entered contention in a joint bid with Apollo.

On April 26 and May 2, respectively, Fox Business Network and The Wall Street Journal reported that Sinclair was nearing an agreement to purchase the networks for $10 billion. On May 3, Sinclair officially announced that via its subsidiary Diamond Sports Group, it had agreed to purchase the networks for $10.6 billion, pending regulatory approval. At the same time, it was also revealed that Entertainment Studios would hold an equity stake in the company and serve as a "content partner". Three senators (Cory Booker, Bernie Sanders, and Elizabeth Warren) called for the sale to be reviewed by the Department of Justice, citing concerns over Sinclair's political views, and that it could use the networks as leverage for carriage agreements for its broadcast television stations.

The sale was completed on August 22, 2019. The networks would continue to temporarily use the "Fox Sports" branding under a transitional license agreement with Fox Corporation; Sinclair CEO Chris Ripley stated that there were plans to eventually rebrand them under either a new name, or to "partner with a brand who wants more exposure". There were also plans to increase non-event programming, and emphasis on sports betting in its programming. In November 2019, the Sun-Sentinel reported that Fox Sports Florida was to be rebranded "within the next few months".

Due to carriage disputes, Dish Network and Sling TV dropped Fox Sports Networks in July 2019. FuboTV dropped the channels in January 2020, and YouTube TV and Hulu + Live TV followed in October 2020.

On November 4, 2020, Sinclair took a $4.23 billion write-down on the FSN purchase.

Rebranding as Bally Sports 

On November 17, 2020, it was reported by Sportico that Sinclair was considering rebranding the networks via a naming rights agreement, and was reportedly in talks with multiple companies involved in sports betting. The next day, Sinclair announced that it had entered into an agreement with casino operator Bally's Corporation to acquire the naming rights under a 10-year deal. The agreement included integration of Bally's content on the channels and other Sinclair properties (including its television stations, Stadium, and Tennis Channel), and a warrant giving Sinclair the option to acquire a 14.9% stake in Bally's Corporation, and up to 24.9% if performance criteria are met. Sinclair announced in December 2020 that it planned to launch its own direct-to-consumer Bally's-branded streaming service, including live streaming of its linear sports networks, in 2021.

On January 27, 2021, Sinclair announced that the networks would be rebranded as Bally Sports with Fox Sports Carolinas and Fox Sports Tennessee discontinued and their sports programming dispersed to the Bally Sports South and Southeast channels. To better reflect their target markets, Prime Ticket and SportsTime Ohio were rebranded as Bally Sports SoCal and Bally Sports Great Lakes respectively. In March 2021, Sinclair revealed that the relaunch would occur on March 31, the eve of Major League Baseball's Opening Day.

Networks

Owned-and-operated

Affiliates

Partner services

Comcast SportsNet
From its inception in 1997 until July 31, 2012, Comcast maintained an agreement to carry select programming sourced from Fox Sports Net on its six Comcast SportsNet regional networks: Comcast SportsNet Bay Area, Comcast SportsNet California, Comcast SportsNet Chicago, Comcast SportsNet Mid-Atlantic, Comcast SportsNet New England and Comcast SportsNet Philadelphia.

This deal stemmed from the circumstances surrounding the 1997 launch of the original Comcast SportsNet in Philadelphia, where Rainbow's regional sports network SportsChannel Philadelphia, and sister premium service PRISM (which offered a mix of sports and movies) were seemingly gutted by Comcast's acquisition of Spectacor -- owner of the Philadelphia Flyers -- and a stake in the Philadelphia 76ers, with plans to launch their own network, only for Rainbow to join Fox and Liberty, possibly meaning SportsChannel and PRISM would become FSN affiliates instead. Ultimately, the potential issues were settled in a deal that saw PRISM and SportsChannel's local coverage move to Comcast SportsNet, which would then become an FSN affiliate, while PRISM was replaced by Liberty's premium movie network Starz!.

Most of Fox Sports Networks' other programming was later carried in the Baltimore and Washington, D.C. markets on MASN2. Select games were also shown on Cox Communications local origination channels (later branded YurView), mostly in Rhode Island and Virginia. The Cox networks were exclusive to their cable systems.

Broadcast TV partners
At least two times in its history Fox Sports Net, partnered with broadcast TV stations to fill coverage gaps in markets where it did not have an affiliated regional sports network. Upon its launch, Fox Sports Net did not have an outlet in New York, the nation's largest media market (Cablevision's SportsChannel would not merge into Fox Sports until the following year). To overcome this obstacle, Fox Sports Net paid WBIS-TV $30 million to broadcast games and nightly news shows for the next five years. WBIS-TV itself was a new station that launched on July 1, 1996, when Dow Jones & Company and ITT Corporation purchased it from the City of New York. The Fox Sports programming complimented its "S+" format which combined sports programming and business news.

From September 2012 to September 2013, Fox syndicated select college football and basketball games produced by the Fox Sports regional networks to broadcast television stations in some of the markets where the aforementioned Comcast SportsNet had dropped coverage. These stations included WLVI (Boston), KICU-TV (San Francisco), WMCN-TV (Philadelphia), and WDCA (Washington, DC).

Fox College Sports (FCS)

Fox Sports Networks also operated Fox College Sports (FCS), a slate of three digital cable channels (Fox College Sports Atlantic, Fox College Sports Central, and Fox College Sports Pacific) featuring programming divided by region (primarily collegiate and high school sports, as well as minor league sports events) from each individual FSN network; the FCS networks also carry each affiliate's regional sports news programs and non-news-and-event programming (such as coaches shows, team magazines, and documentaries). The three networks were, more or less, condensed versions of the 22 FSN-affiliated networks (including Comcast SportsNet Mid-Atlantic), though the channels also showed international events that did not fit within the programming inventories of FSN or Fox Soccer Plus (and prior to 2013, the latter's now-defunct parent Fox Soccer), such as the Commonwealth Games, World University Games and the FINA World Swimming Championships.

The three FCS channels offered FSN feeds from the following channels, including live Big 12 Conference football, Pac-12 Conference football and basketball and Atlantic Coast Conference basketball games. The channels also rebroadcast shows originally produced by and shown on the following listed networks:
 FCS Atlantic: Fox Sports South, Fox Sports Carolinas, Fox Sports Tennessee, Fox Sports Southeast, Fox Sports Florida, Fox Sports Sun, MSG Plus and AT&T SportsNet Pittsburgh;
 FCS Central: Fox Sports Detroit, Fox Sports Southwest, Fox Sports Oklahoma, Fox Sports North, Fox Sports Wisconsin, Fox Sports Midwest, Fox Sports Kansas City, Fox Sports Indiana and Fox Sports Ohio;
 FCS Pacific: Fox Sports Arizona, Fox Sports West/Prime Ticket, AT&T SportsNet Rocky Mountain and Root Sports Northwest.

Fox College Sports also broadcast high school and Independent Women's Football League games, and college magazine and coach's shows. Fox College Sports formerly partnered with Big Ten Network to provide programming.

High definition
All of the Fox Sports Networks regional affiliates maintained high definition simulcast feeds presented in 720p (the default resolution format for 21st Century Fox's broadcast and pay television properties). All sports programming broadcast on each of the networks (including most team-related analysis and discussion programs, and non-event amateur sports programs) was broadcast in a format optimized for 16:9 widescreen displays, with graphics framed within a widescreen safe area rather than the 4:3 safe area, intended to be shown in a letterboxed format for standard definition viewers.

National programs

Programming strategy
The programming strategy adopted by most of the Fox Sports Networks was to acquire the play-by-play broadcast rights to major sports teams in their regional market. This did not include NFL games, since the league's contracts require all games to be aired on broadcast television in each participating team's local markets. Therefore, FSN focused on other major professional leagues, like the MLB, NHL, NBA and WNBA.

In addition to local play-by-play coverage, the FSN networks also broadcast and produced pre-game shows, post-game shows, and weekly "magazine" shows centered on the teams that maintained rights with the individual network. In some markets, FSN competed directly with other regional sports networks for the broadcast rights to team-specific programming. FSN networks also purchased shows or broker time slots for sports and outdoors programming from outside producers in their region to fill out their schedule further, with Fox Sports purchasing additional programming for national airing. Finally, low-trafficked late night and early morning timeslots were programmed locally with paid programming.

Also, FSN competed directly with ESPN in acquiring the conference rights to various collegiate sports events. One notable agreement was that with the Pac-12 Conference, in which packages of football and men's basketball regular season games were broadcast across all FSN networks within the regions served by each Pac-12 member university. Fox Sports Networks broadcast the majority of the Pac-12 Conference men's basketball tournament, except the tournament final, as well as a few Pac-12 matches from other conference-sanctioned sports (such as baseball and volleyball).

Besides play-by-play game rights, FSN provided a common set of programming that was available to all its regional sports networks, most notably The Dan Patrick Show, The Best Damn Sports Show Period and Final Score (TBDSSP and Final Score eventually ceased production, while The Dan Patrick Show later moved to the NBC Sports Network). Until August 2012, in some of regions served by that RSN, member channels of the competing Comcast SportsNet (as mentioned above) carried FSN programming through broadcast agreements with Fox Sports.

Fox Sports Networks' national sports telecasts were formerly marketed under the "FSN" brand; these national programs began to use more generic branding with fewer references to FSN or Fox in 2008, as a result of a number of Fox Sports Net affiliates being rebranded or realigned with other RSN chains (including FSN New England and FSN Bay Area, which both became part of Comcast SportsNet; FSN New York's relaunch as MSG Plus, the sister to MSG Network; and the eventual relaunch of several FSN affiliates acquired by DirecTV Sports Networks under the Root Sports brand), however these networks later reverted to utilizing Fox branding on their FSN-syndicated broadcasts.

National prime time programming
In addition to regional programming, the Fox Sports Networks carried some prime time programming distributed to all of the regional networks (including past and present series such as The Best Damn Sports Show Period and Chris Myers Interviews). FSN tried to compete with ESPN in regards to original programming, most notably with the National Sports Report, a daily sports news program designed to compete with ESPN's SportsCenter, which debuted on FSN in 1996. Originally a two-hour program known as Fox Sports News, the running time of National Sports Report was steadily cut back (eventually dwindling to 30 minutes) as its ratings declined and the cost of producing the program increased. FSN hired popular former SportsCenter anchor Keith Olbermann and used him to promote the show heavily; ratings continued to slide (especially as Best Damn Sports Show Period's popularity increased), however, leading Fox Sports to cancel the National Sports Report, which aired its last edition in February 2002.

In some markets, FSN aired the Regional Sports Report (whose headline title was usually customized with the name of the region in which the particular program was broadcast, such as the Midwest Sports Report or Detroit Sports Report), a companion news program focusing primarily on regional sports as well as highlights and news on other sports teams that debuted in 2000 to complement the National Sports Report; many of the regional reports were cancelled in 2002 due to increasing costs of producing the individual programs.

Most of the national studio programming seen on FSN originated from the Fox Television Center in Hollywood, CA; in 1998, operations moved to the new Fox Network Center, located on the 20th Century Fox backlot in Century City. Some programming was instead produced from the FSN headquarters in the Westwood district.

Live national play-by-play
 Big 12 college football and women's college basketball
 Conference USA college football, and men's and women's college basketball
 Pac-12 college football, and men's and women's college basketball
 UEFA Champions League soccer (selected Tuesday and Wednesday matches)
 UEFA Europa League soccer
 Formula One (1998–2000)

Other sports
 Association of Volleyball Professionals (pro beach volleyball)
 French Open, Indian Wells Masters and Miami Masters (tennis)
 Campbell's Hall of Fame Tennis Classic
 Invesco Series QQQ tennis tour
 Red Bull Air Race
 International Fight League (2006-2008)
 Pride Fighting Championships

Former programming
 2Xtreem Motorcycle TV (2008) – a renovation series focusing on motorcycle customizing, hosted by four-person team of current and former AMA licensed racers and mechanics. The show remains in production and was offered to FSN and its other networks in a brokered programming arrangement.
 54321 (November 2002 – November 2003) – a short-lived action sports news and variety program hosted by Leeann Tweeden, Chad Towersey, Kip Williamson and Jason "Wee-Man" Acuña.
 Amazing Sports Stories (2007-2011) a weekly half-hour re-enactment series illustrating various sports-related human interest stories (among those recounted included those on Bert Shepard's only game as a major-league pitcher, in which he made history as the first Major League Baseball player to play wearing a prosthetic device (it replaced one of his legs); Jackie Mitchell, a female pitcher who struck out Babe Ruth and Lou Gehrig in an exhibition game; Lawrence Lemieux, a Canadian Olympic yachtsman who sacrificed his chance at a medal to save the life of two fellow competitors from Singapore; and Ben Malcolmson, a writer for the University of Southern California newspaper The Daily Trojan who walked onto the USC Trojans football team).
 Baseball's Golden Age (July 6 – September 28, 2008) – a 13-episode documentary series profiling the history of baseball from the 1920s to the 1960s, illustrated partly using archived film footage.
 BCS Breakdown (September 2006 – 2011) – a preview of the week's top college football games, with analysis on their potential influence on the Bowl Championship Series standings; the program was hosted by Tom Helmer, with Gary Barnett and Petros Papadakis as analysts. The program was created through Fox Sports' acquisition of the television rights to the Bowl Championship Series (with the exception of the Rose Bowl Game) that ran until the 2011 series.
 The Best Damn Sports Show Period (July 23, 2001 – June 30, 2009) – a late-night panel discussion program featuring analysis of sports headlines and interviews.
 Beyond the Glory (January 7, 2001 – January 1, 2006) – a biographical program focusing on events and notable athletes in sports.
 Boys in the Hall (2011-2012) a documentary series, narrated by Tom Brokaw, chronicling notable baseball players.
 Breaking Par (2016—2021) a monthly half-hour series that looks at the game of golf through a different lens.
 The Chris Myers Interview (2008–2011) – an interview program featuring one-on-one discussions with sports figures, hosted by Chris Myers.
 The Dan Patrick Show (October 25, 2010 – October 17, 2012) – a simulcast of the sports talk radio program hosted by Dan Patrick; the program moved to NBC Sports Network (now NBCSN), Root Sports, and the Audience Network in 2012.
 Destination Polaris (2013—2021) A weekly magazine show focusing on all-terrain vehicles made by Polaris Industries, their owners, and what people do with their ATVs. Sponsored by Polaris and runs on the network via a brokered-time agreement.
 FSN Across America (2003–2004) – a newsmagazine program featuring in-depth stories and interviews. Original co-host Carolyn Hughes was released by FSN citing a violation of a morals clause in Hughes's contract following the discovery of her affair with Los Angeles Dodgers pitcher Derek Lowe in 2004; the show was cancelled shortly afterward.
 The FSN Baseball Report (2006–2008) – a daily baseball analysis program aired during the Major League Baseball season.
 FSN Final Score (2006–2011) – a half-hour national sports news program (later retitled as simply Final Score on April 23, 2008) strictly focusing on game highlights that ran from July 3, 2006, to 2011; the program was originally anchored by FSN veterans Van Earl Wright, Barry LeBrock and Andrew Siciliano, later joined by newcomers Greg Wolf and Danyelle Sargent.
 FSN Pro Football Preview (2005–2010) – a weekly analysis program featuring previews of the week's upcoming National Football League games.
 Goin' Deep (2000–2001) – an hour-long newsmagazine series focusing on contentious issues in sports; the program was originally hosted by Joe Buck and later by Chris Myers.
 I, Max (May 10, 2004 – February 18, 2005) – a talk show hosted by Max Kellerman; the program was cancelled due to multiple factors, including Kellerman taking time away from the sports television industry after his brother's murder and creative differences regarding the show's future direction.
 In Focus on FSN (2006–2009) a half-hour series, hosted by Dick Enberg, taking a look at the impact of a particular sports event, mostly told through still photography.
 The Last Word (March 1998,–May, 2002) – a nightly sports analysis and discussion program originally hosted by Wallace Matthews (in New York City) and Jim Rome (in Los Angeles), the latter of whom later took over as the program's sole host.
 Million Dollar Challenge (2000) - a game show where six contestants compete in sports-related physical challenges for a chance to win up to $1 million.
 Mind, Body & Kickin' Moves (2007-2009) – a re-edited version of the British martial arts show Mind, Body & Kick Ass Moves.
 NASCAR This Morning (2001-2004) – a morning program featuring analysis and news around the NASCAR circuit.
 The Next Great Champ (2004, Episodes 5–10) - A reality television series where 12 fighters battled for a professional contract with Oscar De La Hoya's Golden Boy Promotions and a cash prize. The Fox television network cancelled the show after 4 episodes, and the final six aired on FSN. Otis Griffin was the winner of the competition.
 NFL This Morning/The NFL Show (2001–2002) - An NFL pregame show with a mix of football talk and comedy, hosted by Chris Myers, along with Marv Levy, Deacon Jones, Billy Ray Smith and Jay Mohr. Mohr, Smith, Jones, and Levy were replaced with Tony Siragusa, Michael Irvin, and comedian Tommy Davidson for season 2.
 The Official BCS Ratings Show (October 15, 2006 – 2011) – The weekly program announcing the current Bowl Championship Series standings (equivalent to ESPN's current College Football Playoff standings show); the program was hosted by Tom Helmer, with Gary Barnett and Petros Papadakis as analysts. The program aired on FSN as a result of Fox Sports' acquisition of the television rights to the Bowl Championship Series (with the exception of the Rose Bowl Game that ran until the 2011 series.
 Shaun Alexander Live (2001) – a short-lived variety show that ran for several months in 2001; the program poked fun of host Shaun Alexander's lack of recognition despite his accomplishments.
 Toughest Cowboy (2007-2008) – a series of weekly competitions in which rodeo cowboys attempt to ride in bareback, saddle bronc, and bull riding. Each of those three disciplines is a round in the event, and this show tours arenas throughout the United States.
 Ring of Honor Wrestling (2019—2021) – a professional wrestling program featuring matches from the Ring of Honor promotion. 
 Sports Geniuses (March–June 2000) – a sports trivia game show, hosted by Matt Vasgersian.
 The Sports List (August 1 – September 7, 2004) – a daily sports news program featuring a countdown of ten stories based on sports topic, hosted by Summer Sanders.
 Sport Science (September 9, 2007 – October 20, 2009) – a weekly program explaining various athletic skills and techniques through scientific methods, many of which analyzed for the program in a performance laboratory at an airport hangar set up by FSN. The concept then moved to ESPN, where Sports Science is a regular SportsCenter segment with some 'best-of' compilation programs.
 TNA iMPACT! (June 2004 – May 2005) – a professional wrestling program featuring matches from the promotion then known as Total Nonstop Action Wrestling; the program has since moved to several different networks, and the promotion is now known as Impact Wrestling.
 Totally Football (2000–2001) – a weekly football analysis program.
 Totally NASCAR (2001–2004 and 2010) – a daily program featuring news around the NASCAR circuit, interviews and race highlights (including those not permitted for carriage by the similarly formatted ESPN2 program RPM 2Night). Many FSN affiliates carried Around the Track, a similarly formatted version of the program.
 The Ultimate Fan League (1998–1999) – a sports trivia game show, hosted by Bil Dwyer.
 You Gotta See This (1998–2007) – a video compilation series featuring unusual and amazing highlights from the world of sports.

In addition, FSN aired an extensive lineup of poker shows, including Poker Superstars Invitational Tournament and MansionPoker.net PokerDome Challenge. The World Poker Tour began broadcasting on FSN with its seventh season. It recently concluded airing its 15th season.

Teams by network

Pay-per-view
FSN distributed its first pay-per-view event on November 10, 2006, a boxing match in which former heavyweight champion Evander Holyfield defeated Fres Oquendo in a unanimous decision at the Alamodome in San Antonio, Texas. The fight was also streamed free of charge on the FoxSports.com website outside the United States.

Americans in Focus
In February 2008, FSN launched a public service initiative called "Americans in Focus", with the sponsorship support of Farmers Insurance. This initiative consists of one-minute vignettes profiling persons of non-Caucasian ethnicity, with segments airing on the FSN networks in February 2008 and 2009 during Black History Month, from September 15 to October 15, 2008, for Hispanic Heritage Month and in March 2009 for Asian Pacific American Heritage Month. The Americans in Focus vignettes and the companion sub-site on the Fox Sports website were discontinued in April 2009.

See also
 Fox Corporation
 Fox Broadcasting Company
 Fox Sports
 FS1
 FS2
 FoxSports.com
 Fox Deportes
 Fox Soccer Plus
 Fox Sports Racing
 Broadcasting of sports events
 Regional sports network
 NBC Sports Regional Networks

References

External links

 
Sinclair Broadcast Group
Entertainment Studios
Former subsidiaries of The Walt Disney Company
Former News Corporation subsidiaries
SportsChannel
Prime Sports
Television channels and stations established in 1996
Television channels and stations disestablished in 2021
Companies based in Los Angeles
Companies based in Houston
1996 establishments in the United States
2021 disestablishments in Texas
Fox Sports
2019 mergers and acquisitions